Ira H. Van Cleave was an American football and baseball coach.  He served as the head football coach at Fort Hays State University in Hays, Kansas two seasons, from 1913 to 1914, and at Whittier College in Whittier, California for one season, in 1920, compiling a career college football coaching record of 13–7.

Head coaching record

References

Year of birth missing
Year of death missing
Fort Hays State Tigers football coaches
Springfield Pride baseball players
Whittier Poets baseball coaches
Whittier Poets football coaches